Sheng Thao (born 1985) is an American politician and the 51st and current Mayor of Oakland, California. She is the first Hmong-American mayor of a major city in the United States.

Early life and education 
Thao was born and raised in Stockton, California. Her parents were refugees from Laos who escaped Hmong genocide and eventually immigrated to the United States. Thao was the seventh of ten children and grew up in poverty, spending some of her childhood in public housing.

At age 17, Thao moved out of her home and began working at a Walgreens in Richmond. After moving to Oakland in her 20s, she became a victim of domestic violence while in an abusive relationship. Thao left the relationship when she was six months pregnant, and then lived in her car and couch surfed before and after her son was born. When her son was ten months old, Thao began attending Merritt College in Oakland while raising her son as a single mother and working as a research assistant.

After she completed an associate's degree in legal studies from Merritt, Thao transferred to the University of California, Berkeley, where she earned a bachelor's degree in legal studies and a minor in city planning. While at UC Berkeley, Thao helped create the Bear Pantry, a program which provided food to food-insecure students.

Early career 
Following her graduation from UC Berkeley in 2012, Thao worked for At-Large Councilmember Rebecca Kaplan as a paid intern. Thao later worked for Kaplan at the Oakland City Council and  became her chief of staff in 2017.

Oakland City Council
Thao served in the Oakland City Council's 4th district seat, representing the neighborhoods of Montclair, Laurel, Melrose, Redwood Heights, and the Dimond District. She was the first Hmong woman to be elected as a member of the city council in the state of California and the first Hmong person elected to the Oakland City Council. On the city council, Thao served as president pro tempore.

Thao decided to run for office in 2018, when the election for the district 4 City Council seat was an open race, lacking an incumbent. Thao defeated six other candidates and won with 54% of the vote after seven rounds of instant-runoff voting tabulation. For each of the 7 rounds she had the most votes of any candidate. Thao's priorities which she ran on were tackling Oakland's housing crisis, improving public safety with better response systems and community policing, and building public infrastructure such as libraries and parks. One of Thao's opponents Charlie Michelson, had been endorsed by Mayor Libby Schaaf. During her campaign, Thao and fellow candidates Pamala Harris and Nayeli Maxson co-endorsed each other in the ranked-choice voting. Dubbing themselves the "Women's Leadership Slate", they urged voters to rank the three of them as their first three picks.

After Kamala Harris was elected vice president of the United States, Thao and other elected officials lobbied Governor Gavin Newsom to appoint Barbara Lee to the U.S. Senate seat that Harris would vacate.

Mayoral campaign

On November 10, 2021, Thao announced her candidacy for the 2022 Oakland mayoral election.

During her campaign, Thao was supported by many trade unions, and she was endorsed by the local Democratic Party and Rep. Ro Khanna. Loren Taylor, one of her opponents, was endorsed by Libby Schaaf, the incumbent mayor of Oakland, as well as London Breed and Sam Liccardo, the mayors of nearby San Francisco and San Jose. By the end of the campaign, Thao and Taylor were considered to be the two front-runners. Thao was viewed as a progressive candidate, while opponents Taylor and Ignacio De La Fuente were viewed as more centrist.

In June 2022, a former staffer filed an informal verbal complaint with the Public Ethics Commission that alleged Thao had City Council staff work on her campaign in a possible violation of state election laws, and the staffer was fired after refusing to work on Thao's campaign. Thao denied the allegations and the ethics commission opened an investigation in October 2022.

Thao won the ranked-choice election by 677 votes in the final round of tabulation.

Personal life 
Thao has lived in Oakland during her entire adulthood. She lives with her partner, Andre, and their two children. When she served on the Oakland City Council, she was one of three council members who rented their home. She is the first renter to be elected as Oakland's mayor.

References

External links 

1985 births
21st-century American politicians
American mayors of Asian descent
American politicians of Hmong descent
Asian-American people in California politics
Living people
Mayors of Oakland, California
Oakland City Council members
University of California, Berkeley alumni
Women in California politics
Women mayors of places in California
21st-century American women politicians